Lensvik is a former municipality in the old Sør-Trøndelag county in Norway. The  municipality existed from 1905 until its dissolution in 1964. The municipality was located along the western shore of the Trondheimsfjorden and it encompassed the central part of what is now Orkland municipality in Trøndelag county. The administrative centre was the village of Lensvik where the Lensvik Church is located.

History
The municipality of Lensvik was established on 1 January 1905 when it was separated from the municipality of Rissa which originally spanned both sides of the Trondheimsfjorden. The separation left Lensvik municipality (population: 1,019) on the west side of the fjord and the remainder of Rissa on the east side of the fjord. During the 1960s, there were many municipal mergers across Norway due to the work of the Schei Committee. On 1 January 1964, the municipality of Lensvik (population: 1,136) was merged with the eastern part of Agdenes municipality (population: 858) and the Ingdalen district of the municipality of Stadsbygd to form a new, larger municipality called Agdenes.

Government
All municipalities in Norway, including Lensvik, are responsible for primary education (through 10th grade), outpatient health services, senior citizen services, unemployment and other social services, zoning, economic development, and municipal roads. The municipality is governed by a municipal council of elected representatives, which in turn elects a mayor.

Municipal council
The municipal council  of Lensvik was made up of 13 representatives that were elected to four year terms. The party breakdown of the final municipal council was as follows:

See also
List of former municipalities of Norway

References

Former municipalities of Norway
Orkland
1905 establishments in Norway
1964 disestablishments in Norway